Armudpadar is a village and municipality in the Khachmaz Rayon of Azerbaijan.  It has a population of 1,838.  The municipality consists of the villages of Armudpadar and Padar.

References 

Populated places in Khachmaz District